Walter Horner Lemm (October 23, 1919 – October 8, 1988) was an American football coach at the high school, collegiate and professional levels and achieved his greatest prominence as head coach of the American Football League's Houston Oilers and the National Football League's St. Louis Cardinals.

Early career
Lemm graduated from Carroll College, in Waukesha, Wisconsin, in 1942 after playing football for head coach John W. Breen.  After service in World War II during the next two years, Lemm served as an assistant coach at the University of Notre Dame under Hugh Devore in 1945. Lemm returned to Carroll as an assistant coach with the school's football team the following year, then became a head coach for the first time, accepting the top job for Waukesha High School in 1948.

Coaching career
Following Lemm's one year at Waukesha, Carroll's former coach, Breen, took the head coaching position at Lake Forest College. Lemm served under his leadership for the next three years, while also working as the school's head basketball coach, then replaced Breen in 1952.  During his two seasons, he compiled an 11–4–1 record before leaving to accept the head coach position at Montana State University.  An 8-1 season in 1954 was followed the next year by a 4–4–1 campaign.  On May 14, 1956, he reached the National Football League (NFL) when he accepted a defensive assistant position with the Chicago Cardinals.

Lemm spent just one season before resigning to again accept the head coaching position at Lake Forest.  During the next two years, he nearly matched his previous stint at the school with an 11–5 record, winning District Coach of the Year accolades in 1957 from the National Association of Intercollegiate Athletics (NAIA).  On February 21, 1959, he returned to an assistant's role with the Cardinals, and would remain at the professional level for the remainder of his career.

After again spending a single season with the Cardinals, Lemm resigned on January 12, 1960 to accept an assistant coaching position with the Houston Oilers of the seminal American Football League.  During the first season of play, the Oilers captured the league's first-ever title, but Lemm resigned after the season, returning to Libertyville, Illinois to work in the sporting goods industry.

However, after a slow start to the 1961 season that saw the team with a 1–3–1 record, Oilers' head coach Lou Rymkus was fired. Lemm was offered the position by his former coach John Breen, the Oilers' Director of Player Personnel, and proceeded to lead the team to nine straight victories.  The team then won its second straight title with a 10–3 win over the San Diego Chargers on December 24, 1961, and Lemm was named AFL Coach of the Year for his efforts.

After orally agreeing to a contract for the next season, Lemm instead resigned on February 22, 1962 to take the top spot with the Cardinals, citing the proximity of St. Louis to his home in Lake Bluff, Illinois.  He replaced Pop Ivy at St. Louis, and Ivy replaced Lemm at Houston.  After a 4–9–1 record in his first year, Lemm came close to capturing the NFL's Eastern Conference title with a 9–5 season in 1963 and a 9–3–2 mark the following year.  After signing a contract with a huge pay increase, the Cardinals crashed in 1965 with a 5–9 mark, with Lemm seemingly having job security.  However, after Lemm was asked to stay in St. Louis as a full-time coach, he resigned on January 10, 1966, again citing family considerations.  Oddly, he then accepted the head coaching job with his former team in Houston 19 days later.

The Oilers struggled in 1966 with a 3–11 record, but bounced back in 1967 with a 9–4–1 record and a spot in the AFL Championship game.  After a 40–7 thrashing at the hands of the Oakland Raiders, the Oilers again reached the postseason in 1969 compiling a mediocre 6–6–2 record and were again dismantled by the Raiders, 56–7, in the AFL's oddly constructed one year playoff system. For that season the first place team of the West played the second place team of the East and vice versa. The team's first year in the post-merger NFL, 1970, finished with a disastrous 3–10–1 mark.  Following a 44–0 loss to his former team in St. Louis on November 1, 1970, Lemm announced he would be retiring at the conclusion of the year, this time citing health issues. Lemm's final game came on December 20 of that year, a 52–10 loss to the Oilers' Lone Star State rivals, the Dallas Cowboys.

Later life and death
Lemm died on October 8, 1988 in Milwaukee, Wisconsin after a college reunion.

Head coaching record

College football

AFL/NFL

Interim coach for last 9 games of regular season

See also
 List of American Football League players

References

1919 births
1988 deaths
Basketball coaches from Illinois
Chicago Cardinals coaches
Carroll Pioneers football coaches
Carroll Pioneers football players
College men's basketball head coaches in the United States
High school football coaches in Wisconsin
Houston Oilers coaches
Lake Forest Foresters football coaches
Lake Forest Foresters men's basketball coaches
Montana State Bobcats football coaches
Montana State Bobcats men's basketball coaches
Notre Dame Fighting Irish football coaches
People from Lake Bluff, Illinois
Sportspeople from Chicago
St. Louis Cardinals (football) coaches
Players of American football from Chicago
St. Louis Cardinals (football) head coaches
Houston Oilers head coaches